Castianeira crocata is a species of true spider in the family Corinnidae, sometimes called by the common name red stripe spider. It is found in the United States. Though its body shape is quite different, its characteristic black body and red-marked back puts it at risk of being mistaken for a black widow spider.

References

Corinnidae
Articles created by Qbugbot
Spiders described in 1847